Gurthrö Garth Steenkamp (born 12 June 1981 in Paarl) is a former South African Rugby union player. He plays loosehead prop. Steenkamp had previously played for the Free State Cheetahs (Currie Cup) the Bulls and the Cats (Super 14). He made his debut for the Springboks in late 2004 against Scotland.

During the 2005 Tri Nations he seemed to have cemented his place in the Springboks with a strong performance against the Wallabies at Ellis Park. A broken hand at the end of the tournament stalled his career for the Springboks. Over the next couple of years he battled with injuries until making a successful return to Super Rugby and the Springboks in 2007. He was selected to represent  South Africa at the 2007 Rugby World Cup. He also won the 2010 South African player of the year. He also played all five matches for South Africa at the 2011 Rugby World Cup.

Honours 
South Africa Under-21
U-21 World Cup: 2002

Blue Bulls
Currie Cup: 2009

Bulls
Super Rugby: 2007, 2009, 2010

South Africa
World Cup: 2007

Toulouse
French Champions: 2012

References

External links

Profile on Bluebulls.co.za

1981 births
Living people
People from the Western Cape
Afrikaner people
Rugby union props
South African rugby union players
South Africa international rugby union players
Bulls (rugby union) players
Blue Bulls players
Lions (United Rugby Championship) players
Free State Cheetahs players
Stade Toulousain players
Alumni of Paarl Boys' High School
Sportspeople from Paarl
South African people of Dutch descent
South African people of German descent
South African expatriate rugby union players
Expatriate rugby union players in France
South African expatriate sportspeople in France
Rugby union players from the Western Cape